Channapatana is a city and taluk headquarters in Ramanagara District, Karnataka, India. Channapatna is approximately 60kms from Bangalore and 80kms from Mysore. The Kannadiga film actor Kishore was born here in 1974.

Geography
Channapatna has an average elevation of 739 metres (2424 ft).

Total length of roads is 108.20 km. Total water supply is 70.50 litres per capita per day. This means a per capita water supply of 65.50 litres. In summer the temperature is 32 °C. In winter it is 19 °C.

Channapatna is located on the Bangalore - Mysore highway. It is about 55 km from Bangalore and 80 km from Mysore.

Demographics
As of 2011 India census, Channapatna City Municipal Council has population of 71,942 of which 36,098 are males while 35,844 are females as per report released by Census India 2011.

Toys

The city is known for its wooden toys and lacquerware. Channapatn is also called "Town of toys" ("Gombegala nagara"). These toys are manufactured in traditional and advanced small-scale industries. Manufacturing and twisting of raw silk, rice, ragi and coconut is a major product of Channapattana taluk. The origin of these toys is dated back to the reign of Tipu Sultan  who invited the artisans from Persia in order to train the local artisans in the art of wooden toy making. These toys have been  given Geographical Indication tag by Government of India.

References

External links

 Channapatna's official Website

Cities and towns in Ramanagara district